The Monaco Cemetery (French: Cimetière de Monaco) is a cemetery in La Colle.

Overview
The cemetery contained 2350 tombs until 2014, when 198 more were built. It is open to the public from 8am to 7pm in the summer and from 8am to 6pm in the winter.

Many sculptures in the cemetery were designed by Umberto Bassignani.

Since 2008, two computer screens at the entry gate enable visitors to locate specific tombs before they go in.

On 27 August 2015 Albert II, Prince of Monaco dedicated a memorial stele in honour of foreign Jews who were taken from Monegasque hotels by the Nazis during the night of 27–28 August 1942.

Notable burials
 Josephine Baker, American-French entertainer, civil rights activist, and war hero and her fourth husband, composer Jo Bouillon
 Marie Bell and her husband Jean Chevrier, actors
 Jules Bianchi, Formula One driver
 Anthony Burgess, writer
 Silas Burroughs, pharmacist
 Cécile Chaminade, composer
 Jean Chevrier, actor
 Léo Ferré, poet and composer
 Jean-Michel Folon, artist
 Lewis Gilbert, screenwriter and director
 Roger Moore, British actor
 Princess Ashraf Pahlavi, twin sister of Mohammad Reza Pahlavi, the last Shah of Iran, and a member of the Pahlavi dynasty
 Henryk Szeryng, violinist

There are two Commonwealth War Graves Commission graves at the cemetery. They are the graves of two British soldiers of the First World War; Private A. C. V. Dyer of the Royal Army Medical Corps, who died in May 1917 aged 22, and Captain Leo Lucas Ralli (of the Ralli baronets) of the Army Service Corps who died in April 1917 aged 33.

References

External links
 
 Photo of the Holocaust Monument in the cemetery

Cemeteries in Monaco
Commonwealth War Graves Commissions Cemeteries in Monaco
La Colle, Monaco
1868 establishments in Monaco